Grand Opening and Closing is the debut album by the American avant-garde metal group Sleepytime Gorilla Museum. It was recorded at Polymorph Recording, Oakland, CA, and was recorded, mixed, mastered by bassist Dan Rathbun. The album was produced by Dan Rathbun and Sleepytime Gorilla Museum.

The album was originally released as a CD on October 30, 2001 by Seeland Records in conjunction with Chaosophy Records. When the band signed to The End Records in 2006, the album was re-released on September 5, 2006 with three previously unreleased tracks.

Grand Opening and Closing features David Shamrock on drums, the only SGM album to do so. He was replaced by Frank Grau, who plays drums on "The Stain" for this album.

Like with Of Natural History, some of the album's lyrics are inspired by different authors and poets. For example, the track "Sleep is Wrong" quotes a section of a poem by Dylan Thomas, while "Sleepytime (Spirit is a Bone)" is inspired by William T. Vollmann's The Rainbow Stories and phrenology.

Track listing

Personnel
 Carla Kihlstedt – Electric Violin, Percussion Guitar, Autoharp, Pump Organ, Voice
 Dan Rathbun – Bass Guitar, Slide-piano Log, Pedal-action Wiggler, Thing, Autoharp, Voice
 David Shamrock – Drums, Piano
 Frank Grau – Drums on "The Stain"
 Moe! Staiano – Percussion, Metal, Pressure-cap Marimba, Spring, Spring-nail Guitar, Popping Turtle, Food Containers, Tympani
 Nils Frykdahl – 6 and 12 string guitars, Tibetan Bells, Autoharp, Voice

Notes

2001 debut albums
Avant-garde metal albums
Sleepytime Gorilla Museum albums
The End Records albums